The Holy Saviour of the World Cathedral Also Olinda Cathedral Is a Catholic church located in Olinda, in the state of Pernambuco, home of the archdiocese of Olinda and Recife in Brazil.

The first building built for worship in the present site of the headquarters was a simple chapel. It was raised between 1537 and 1540 and dedicated to Jesus Christ as Savior of the world. The mud, a material of little resistance used, caused that the chapel soon began to decay, and was replaced by another temple in 1584, with several secondary chapels erected by initiative of Frei Antonio Barreiro, third bishop of Brazil.

In 1676, it was elevated to the condition of cathedral with the creation of the respective diocese.

See also
Roman Catholicism in Brazil
Holy Saviour

References

Roman Catholic cathedrals in Pernambuco
Roman Catholic churches completed in 1540
16th-century Roman Catholic church buildings in Brazil